is a Japanese original anime television short film about golf produced by Yostar Pictures and directed by Kengo Saitō. It premiered on Tokyo MX in December 2021.

Characters

Production and release
On October 25, 2021, the original anime produced by Yostar Pictures was announced. It was later revealed to be a television short film, with Kengo Saitō directing the film, Li Hengda producing the film, Kota Nozomi writing the screenplay, Akira Amemiya in charge of the storyboard, and Horita Daisuke composing the music and directing the sound. The 14-minute short film premiered on Tokyo MX on December 31, 2021. The film's theme song is "Gunjō Love theory" by the HAM unit (Miyu Takagi, Yurina Amami, and Ayasa Goto). Crunchyroll and Funimation are both streaming the film outside of Asia.

References

External links
 

2021 anime films
Anime with original screenplays
Crunchyroll anime
Funimation
Golf in anime and manga
Tokyo MX original programming